Truro Township is one of twenty-one townships in Knox County, Illinois, USA.  As of the 2010 census, its population was 840 and it contained 431 housing units.

Geography

Cities, towns, villages
 Williamsfield

Unincorporated towns
 Truro at 
(This list is based on USGS data and may include former settlements.)

Cemeteries

Lakes
 Happy Hollow Lake

Demographics

School districts
 Williamsfield Community Unit School District 210

Political districts
 Illinois's 18th congressional district
 State House District 74
 State Senate District 37

References
 
 United States Census Bureau 2009 TIGER/Line Shapefiles
 United States National Atlas

External links
 City-Data.com
 Illinois State Archives
 Township Officials of Illinois

Townships in Knox County, Illinois
Galesburg, Illinois micropolitan area
Townships in Illinois